Stalachtis euterpe is a species of butterfly of the family Riodinidae. It is found in the Guianas and the Lower Amazon.

Subspecies
Stalachtis euterpe euterpe
Stalachtis euterpe adelpha Staudinger, 1888 (Brazil: Amazonas)
Stalachtis euterpe latefasciata Staudinger, 1888 (Peru)

References

Butterflies described in 1758
Taxa named by Carl Linnaeus
Riodininae